Mountain View is an unincorporated community in Jackson County, Oregon, United States. It lies along Oregon Route 66 between Ashland and Klamath Falls in the Siskiyou Mountains. It is within the boundaries of the Cascade–Siskiyou National Monument. Pinehurst State Airport is on the outskirts of Mountain View.

References

Unincorporated communities in Jackson County, Oregon
Unincorporated communities in Oregon